Martin Faško-Rudáš (born 10 August 2000) is a Slovak professional ice hockey right winger currently playing for the HC Bílí Tygři Liberec of the Czech Extraliga.

International play
He was selected to make his full IIHF international debut, participating for Slovakia in the 2021 IIHF World Championship.

Career statistics

Regular season and playoffs

International

References

External links
 

2000 births
Living people
Sportspeople from Banská Bystrica
Slovak ice hockey right wingers
Everett Silvertips players
Saskatoon Blades players
HC '05 Banská Bystrica players
HC Bílí Tygři Liberec players
Slovak expatriate ice hockey players in the United States
Slovak expatriate ice hockey players in Canada
Slovak expatriate ice hockey players in the Czech Republic